Liberty Township is a township in Dickinson County, Kansas, USA.  As of the 2000 census, its population was 405.

Liberty Township was organized in 1873.

Geography
It contains three cemeteries: Lyona, Riffel, and Woodbine.

Further reading

References

 USGS Geographic Names Information System (GNIS)

External links
 City-Data.com

Townships in Dickinson County, Kansas
Townships in Kansas